Hugh John McDonald (born December 28, 1950) is an American musician who is best known for his session work and for being the current bassist and backup singer of American rock band Bon Jovi, which he joined as an unofficial band member in November 1994, before becoming an official band member in 2016. Before joining Bon Jovi, he was the bass guitarist for the David Bromberg Band, touring extensively worldwide and playing on many Bromberg albums. He has played with many other artists, both live and in the studio, including Willie Nelson, Steve Goodman, Ringo Starr, Lita Ford, Michael Bolton, Cher, Alice Cooper, Ricky Martin, Gavin Whittaker, Michael Bublé, Poison, and did a few dates during Shania Twain's the Woman in Me TV tour.

He has worked with Bon Jovi in the studio since its inception and has been their bass guitarist since original bass guitarist Alec John Such's departure after Cross Roadwhich was released in 1994but was still regarded as an 'unofficial' member of Bon Jovi until 2016. At this time, McDonald was left out of most publicity shoots and album covers but did appear in some of the band's promo videos. The band members said they never agreed to officially replace Such. Regardless, his work with the band earned him a 1995 Metal Edge Readers' Choice Award for "Best Bassist" (tying with White Zombie's Sean Yseult). 
McDonald was one of the studio musicians that recorded Jon Bon Jovi's original first demo for the song "Runaway". When the song became a local hit, Jon Bon Jovi nevertheless assembled a band without McDonald in order to record a full band album around the hit song. He has also appeared on Jon Bon Jovi's solo album Destination Anywhere and was part of Jon Bon Jovi's backing group, The Big Dogs.

McDonald married his long-term partner, Nancy in 1996 but they divorced some years later.

In 2004, McDonald married Kelli, a horse trainer and jewelry designer. McDonald has two children, one of whom, a stepson, is also a musician. In 2018, McDonald was inducted into the Rock and Roll Hall of Fame as a member of Bon Jovi.

Discography

With Alice Cooper

Studio albums

Trash (1989)
Hey Stoopid (1991)

Compilation albums

Classicks (1995)
Francisco Brugal (1995)

With Bon Jovi

Studio albums
These Days (1995)
Crush (2000)
Bounce (2002)
Have a Nice Day (2005)
Lost Highway (2007)
The Circle (2009)
What About Now (2013)
Burning Bridges (2015)
This House Is Not for Sale (2016)
2020 (2020)

References

1950 births
Living people
American rock bass guitarists
American male bass guitarists
Bon Jovi members
Jersey Shore musicians
Guitarists from Philadelphia
20th-century American guitarists
21st-century American guitarists